Gréta Mayer (born 26 September 2006) is a Hungarian artistic gymnast.  She is a three-time European junior medalist.

Early life 
Gréta Mayer was born in Dunaújváros, Hungary on 26 September 2006.

Gymnastics career

Espoir

2017–18 
Mayer competed at the 2017 Tournoi International where she placed third in the all-around behind Italians Angela Andreoli and Giulia Messali.  She next competed at the Hungarian Master Championships where she placed seventh in the all-around, third on balance beam, and fourth on floor exercise.

In May 2018 Mayer competed at the Elek Matolay Memorial where she placed first in the espoir all-around and on vault, uneven bars, and balance beam.  She placed sixth on floor exercise.  In June she competed at Gym Festival Trnava where she placed second in the all-around behind Dagmara Pyzio of Poland.

2019
Mayer began the year competing at the Elek Matolay Memorial where she won silver on vault and balance beam behind Sabrina Voinea and on floor exercise behind Amalia Puflea.  Mayer next competed at the Hungarian Master Championships where she placed first in the all-around.

Junior

2020
Mayer competed at the Hungarian Championships where she placed first in the all-around.  At the Hungarian Master Championships she placed second in the joint all-around behind senior competitor Zsófia Kovács.  In December she competed at the European Championships where she helped Hungary place third as a team.  Individually she placed ninth in the all-around but won silver on balance beam behind Ana Bărbosu and bronze on floor exercise behind Bărbosu and Maria Ceplinschi.

2021
Throughout 2021 Mayer competed at the Hungarian Super Team Championships, the Hungarian Event Championships, and the Hungarian Masters Championships.  Internationally she competed at the Olympic Hopes Cup in November where she helped Hungary finish first as a team and individually she placed first on floor exercise.

Senior

2022 
Mayer turned senior in 2022.  She competed at the Gymnasiade where she helped Hungary finish second as a team behind France.  Individually she placed third in the all-around behind Léa Franceries and Lucie Henna and third on vault behind Franceries and Ceren Biner.  She also finished seventh on floor exercise.  Mayer competed at various World Challenge Cups throughout the year, winning silver medals in Varna and Szomabethely and bronze medals in Koper and Szombathely.  In August Mayer competed at the European Championships alongside Zsófia Kovács, Zója Székely, Csenge Bácskay, and Mirtill Makovits.  They finished seventh as a team and qualified a full team to compete at the upcoming World Championships.  Individually Mayer finished 18th in the all-around.

Competitive history

References

External links 
 

2006 births
Living people
Hungarian female artistic gymnasts
People from Dunaújváros
21st-century Hungarian women